Dodger Point Bridge is a pedestrian suspension bridge  above sea level, located above the Elwha River as it exits the Grand Canyon of the Elwha just past Humes Ranch Cabin, in Washington state, United States. It can be accessed approximate  from the Whiskey Bend trailhead and is the point where the Geyser Valley trail ends.

Pedestrian bridges in Washington (state)
Bridges in Clallam County, Washington
Suspension bridges in Washington (state)